Blagoyevo (Blagojev) is an urban locality (an urban-type settlement) in Udorsky District of the Komi Republic, Russia. As of the 2010 Census, its population was 2,221.

Administrative and municipal status
Within the framework of administrative divisions, the urban-type settlement of Blagoyevo, together with four rural localities, is incorporated within Udorsky District as Blagoyevo Urban-Type Settlement Administrative Territory (an administrative division of the district). As a municipal division, Blagoyevo Urban-Type Settlement Administrative Territory is incorporated within Udorsky Municipal District as Blagoyevo Urban Settlement.

References

Notes

Sources

Urban-type settlements in the Komi Republic
Bulgarian communities
